Dina Gilio-Whitaker is an American academic, journalist and author, who studies Native Americans in the United States, decolonization and environmental justice. She is a member of the Colville Confederated Tribes. In 2019, she published As Long as Grass Grows.

Background
Dina Gilio-Whitaker is a Colville Confederated Tribes member who grew up in Southern California, moving to North Shore in the Hawaiian Islands in 1980. She returned to California, got married and moved to San Clemente. She is a surfer.

As a mature student, Gilio-Whitaker studied at the University of New Mexico, initially intending to go into a legal career. Her master's thesis, Panhe at the Crossroads: Toward an Indigenized Environmental Justice Discourse, was on the topic of indigenous American protests against a toll road being built on sacred land that was also a significant surfing location.

Career
In 2016, Gilio-Whitaker co-authored "All the Real Indians Died Off" and 20 Other Myths About Native Americans with Roxanne Dunbar-Ortiz. In 2017, she wrote a chapter of The Critical Surfer Reader (2017) titled "Appropriating Surfing and the Politics of Indigenous Authenticity".

Since 2017, Gilio-Whitaker has lectured in American Indian Studies at California State University San Marcos, commuting from San Clemente, California. She was offered the position a year earlier, but declined due to book tour responsibilities. She supports a scholarly framework known as "indigenized environmental justice", in which environmentalism would take into account "the history of colonization as a historical process of dispossession of native peoples and their lands in order to understand the way native people are still fighting these battles".

In 2019, Gilio-Whitaker published As Long as Grass Grows. The book outlines the effect of American settlers on indigenous Americans since 1492, the modern environmentalism movement and indigenous approaches to environmental stewardship.

Gilio-Whitaker is also a senior research associate and policy director at the Center for World Indigenous Studies. She runs the company DGW Consulting. She has also volunteered for the Institute for Women Surfers, Native Like Water and the San Onofre Parks Foundation. She maintains a blog, Ruminative.

Selected works

Books

Journal articles

News articles

References

Further reading
 

Native American academics
Native American journalists
Native American writers
21st-century American women writers
Native American women academics
American women academics
Year of birth missing (living people)
Living people
21st-century American journalists
American women journalists
21st-century Native American women
21st-century Native Americans
Journalists from California
Academics from California
Native American people from California
Environmental justice scholars
21st-century American non-fiction writers
21st-century American academics
American women non-fiction writers